Maurice Wohl  (4 January 1917 – 28 June 2007) was a British businessman and philanthropist.

Biography
Maurice Wohl was born in the East End of London to Eastern European parents. At a young age, Wohl became a property developer creating 'United Real Property Trust' in 1948. He rose to success by innovation in raising modern office buildings in the damaged post-World War II London and his business also later spread to Australia. By the mid-1970s, he had retired to Switzerland. Wohl was made Commander of Order of the British Empire (CBE) in 1992.

Wohl died on 28 June 2007 (13th of Tammuz, 5767). He was buried in the Sanhedria Cemetery in Jerusalem the next day, eulogised by former Chief Rabbi of Israel, Yisrael Meir Lau. Vivienne, his wife who had also been very active and highly regarded, died on 24 April 2005 (15th of Nisan, 5765). The couple had been childless.

Civic and philanthropic activities
Wohl was president of the Jerusalem Great Synagogue in Israel. In honour of his many contributions in Jerusalem, Wohl was given the title "Trustee of Jerusalem" (Ne-eman Yerushalayim) by Ehud Olmert when he was mayor of the city. Wohl also received an honorary doctorate from Bar-Ilan University in 2001.

Wohl contributed tens of millions of dollars to the construction of public structures and support of various foundations some of which include:

In Israel
 Wohl Amphitheatre in The Yarkon Park, Tel Aviv
 Wohl Rose Park opposite the Knesset, Jerusalem
 Wohl Archaeological Museum in Old City of Jerusalem
 Wohl Centre (convention/cultural centre), 'The Book and the Wall', designed by architect Daniel Libeskind at Bar-Ilan University
 benefactor of thousands of scholarships to students in Bar Ilan University
 an operating room complex at Shaare Zedek Medical Center in Jerusalem 
 Wohl Institute for Advanced Imaging, Sourasky Medical Center, Tel Aviv
 Wohl Synagogue in 'Lamed' neighbourhood, Tel Aviv
 Mercaz haRav
 The Slonim Yeshiva
 Yeshivat HaKotel
 Jerusalem College of Technology
 Shalva association of mentally and physically challenged children 
 dedicated the first volume of the English edition of Talmud Tractate Bava Metzia by Rabbi Adin Steinsaltz

In the United Kingdom
 Maurice Wohl Charitable Foundation
 Maurice Wohl Charitable Trust
 Maurice Wohl General Dental Practice Centre, Dental Institute at King's College London
 Maurice Wohl Laboratory, Institute of Liver Studies, King's College GKT School of Medicine
 Maurice Wohl Clinical Neuroscience Institute, Institute of Psychiatry, Psychology and Neuroscience at King's College London
 Maurice Wohl Research Fellowship in Surgery/Dental Surgery Details  at Royal College of Surgeons of Edinburgh
 Wohl Virion Centre, Division of Infection and Immunity at University College London

In Ukraine
 the Wohl Centre — jewish community center in Kharkiv city. Inside the building are located: , jewish culture center "Beit Dan" and regional JDC Джойнт.

While many establishments carried the Wohl name, Maurice Wohl was also known for donating to many organisations and charities without that same publicity.

References

External links
 Ha'aretz obituary
 The Wohl Centre at Bar-Ilan University 
 National Union Party (Israel)Obituary 

1917 births
2007 deaths
People educated at the City of London School
People educated at Hackney Downs School
British real estate businesspeople
English Jews
Commanders of the Order of the British Empire
People associated with King's College London
Jewish British philanthropists
20th-century British philanthropists
British expatriates in Switzerland